Grayson Lake is a  reservoir in Carter and Elliott counties in Kentucky. It was created by the United States Army Corps of Engineers in 1968 by impounding the Little Sandy River with the Grayson Dam, an earthen structure 120 feet high, creating a maximum capacity of 118,990 acre-feet. Sections of Kentucky Route 7 were re-routed as a result of the lake's creation. KY 7 now traverses a modern highway stretch around the park, crossing the dam also.

The lake is the major attraction of Grayson Lake State Park.

See also
Grayson Lake State Park

References

External links
 Grayson Lake facilities map

Infrastructure completed in 1968
Protected areas of Carter County, Kentucky
Protected areas of Elliott County, Kentucky
Reservoirs in Kentucky
Bodies of water of Carter County, Kentucky
Bodies of water of Elliott County, Kentucky
1968 establishments in Kentucky